KCYP-LP (97.7 FM) is a radio station licensed to Mission, Texas, United States. The station is currently owned by Intercity Christian Youth Program.

References

External links
 

CYP-LP
CYP-LP